The following is a list of Ottawa Redblacks all-time records and statistics current to the Canadian Football League (CFL)'s 2020 season. This list does not include the records for the Ottawa Rough Riders (1876 to 1996) or the Ottawa Renegades (2002 to 2006).

Grey Cups

Most Grey Cups Won, Player
1 - many players in 2016

Most Grey Cup Appearances, Player
2 - many players in 2015 & 2016

Most Grey Cups Won, Head Coach
1 - Rick Campbell

Most Grey Cup Appearances, Head Coach
2 - Rick Campbell

Coaching

Most Seasons Coached
6 - Rick Campbell

Most Games Coached
106 - Rick Campbell

Most Wins
44 - Rick Campbell

Most Losses
62 - Rick Campbell

Games 

Most Games Played
93 – Antoine Pruneau
88 – Alex Mateas 
85 – Brad Sinopoli 
83 – Jon Gott 
82 - Andrew Marshall

Most Seasons Played
6 - Antoine Pruneau
6 - Nolan MacMillan 
6 - Nigel Romick

Scoring 

Most Points – Career
420 – Trevor Harris

Most Points – Season
198 – Henry Burris - 2015

Most Points – Game

46 vs Hamilton - 2018 East semi final

Most Passing Touchdowns – Career
68 – Trevor Harris

Most Passing Touchdowns – Season
30 – Trevor Harris - 2017

Most Passing Touchdowns – Game
6 - Trevor Harris - 2018 East Final
6 - Henry Burris - 2015 Week 20

Most Rushing Touchdowns – Career
13 – Henry Burris
13 - William Powell

Most Rushing Touchdowns – Season
9 – Jeremiah Johnson - 2015

Most Rushing Touchdowns - Game
3 -  Jeremiah Johnson - 2015 Week 10

Most Receiving Touchdowns – Career
30 – Greg Ellingson

Most Receiving Touchdowns – Season
12 – Greg Ellingson - 2017

Most Receiving Touchdown - Game
3 - Greg Ellingson - 2015 Week 20 
3 - Chris Williams - 2016 Week 3

Most Interception Return Touchdowns – Career
1 – many players

Most Interception Return Touchdowns – Season
1 – many players

Passing 

Most Passing Yards – Career
13,096 – Trevor Harris
11,786 – Henry Burris 

Most Passing Yards – Season
5,693 – Henry Burris – 2015
5,116 – Trevor Harris – 2018

Most Passing Yards – Game

504 - Henry Burris - 2015 Week 15

Most Pass Completions – Career
1,071 - Trevor Harris
968 – Henry Burris

Most Pass Completions – Season
481 – Henry Burris – 2015
431 – Trevor Harris – 2018

Most Pass Completions – Game

45 - Henry Burris - 2015 Week 15

Highest Pass Completion Percentage – Career (Minimum 1000 attempts)
70.6 - Trevor Harris
66.8 – Henry Burris

Highest Pass Completion Percentage – Season
73.3 - Trevor Harris - 2016 
70.9 - Henry Burris - 2015

Highest QB Passer Rating - Career 
104.6 - Trevor Harris 
92.4 - Henry Burris

Rushing 

Most Rushing Yards – Career
2,835 – William Powell

Most Rushing Yards – Season
1,363 – William Powell - 2018

Most Rushing Yards – Game
187 – William Powell - 2017 Week 15

Receiving 

Most Receiving Yards– Career
5,127 – Brad Sinopoli
4,866 – Greg Ellingson
2,460 – Chris Williams

Most Receiving Yards – Season
1,459 – Greg Ellingson - 2017 
1,376 - Brad Sinopoli - 2018 
1,260 - Greg Ellingson - 2016 
1,246 - Chris Williams - 2016

Most Receiving Yards – Game
218 - Greg Ellingson - 2016 Week 4

Most Receptions – Career
455 – Brad Sinopoli
332 – Greg Ellingson
172 – Ernest Jackson

Most Receptions – season
116 – Brad Sinopoli - 2018
96 - Greg Ellingson - 2017
91 - Greg Ellingson - 2018
91 – Brad Sinopoli - 2017
90 – Brad Sinopoli - 2016

Most Receptions – Game
11 - Greg Ellingson - 2018 Week 9
11 - Brad Sinopoli - (Twice) 2018 Weeks 4 & 6
11 - Dominique Rhymes - 2019 Week 2

Interceptions 

Most Interceptions – Career
12 – Abdul Kanneh
9 – Antoine Pruneau
9 – Jonathan Rose
7 – Brandyn Thompson 
7 – Jarrell Gavins

Most Interceptions – Season
6 – Abdul Kanneh - 2015

Most Interceptions – Game
2 - Jovon Johnson - 2015 Week 17 
2 - Brandyn Thompson - 2015 Week 18 
2 - Forrest Hightower - 2016 Grey Cup
2 - Jonathan Rose - 2018 Week 14
2 - Abdul Kanneh - 2016 Week 19

Tackles 

Most Defensive Tackles – Career
293– Avery Williams (2018-2022)

Most Defensive Tackles – Season
94 – Taylor Reed – 2017

92– Avery Williams – 2022

84 – Damaso Munoz – 2016

Most Defensive Tackles – Game

14 – Avery Williams – 2021

Quarterback sacks 

Most Sacks – Career
23 - Justin Capicciotti (2014-2015)
21 – Zack Evans (2014-2017)

Most Sacks – Season
12 – Justin Capicciotti (2015)
11 – Justin Capicciotti (2014)

Most Sacks – Game

???

References 
Ottawa Redblacks 2017 Media Guide
Ottawa Redblacks 2016 Media Guide
Ottawa Redblacks Website 

https://www.cfl.ca

Canadian Football League records and statistics
Ottawa Redblacks lists